Potassium dithioferrate is the inorganic compound with the formula KFeS2. It is a purple solid that is insoluble in water.  Regarding its chemical structure, the compound consists of infinite chains of edge-shared anionic FeS4 tetrahedra. Associated with these chains are potassium ions. A related family of one-dimensional materials  with the formula MFe2S3 (M = K, Rb, Cs). These mixed-valence compounds are represented by the mineral rasvumite.

The compound is prepared by heating iron powder, sulfur, and potassium carbonate at 900 °C.  According to the idealized stoichiometry, this reaction is proposed to cogenerate potassium sulfate:
6Fe + 13S  + 4K2CO3  →   6KFeS2  +  K2SO4  + 4CO2

References

Iron compounds
Sulfides
Thiometallates